The Dillard Bleu Devils and Lady Bleu Devils are the athletic teams that represent Dillard University, located in New Orleans, Louisiana, United States, in intercollegiate athletics as a member of the Division I level of the National Association of Intercollegiate Athletics (NAIA), competing in the Gulf Coast Athletic Conference (GCAC) since the 1981–82 academic year.

Varsity teams
Dillard competes in 12 intercollegiate varsity sports: Men's sports include baseball, basketball, cross country, tennis and track & field; while women's sports include basketball, cross country, tennis, track & field and volleyball; and co-ed sports include cheerleading and dance.

Men's basketball
The Dillard Bleu Devils men's basketball team represents Dillard University in New Orleans, Louisiana, United States. The school's team currently competes in the Gulf Coast Athletic Conference, which is part of the National Association of Intercollegiate Athletics. The team plays its home games at 1,500-seat Dent Hall.

Women's basketball
The Dillard Lady Bleu Devils women's basketball team represents Dillard University in New Orleans, Louisiana, United States. The school's team currently competes in the Gulf Coast Athletic Conference, which is part of the National Association of Intercollegiate Athletics. The team plays its home games at 1,500-seat Dent Hall.

Men's and women's cross country
The Dillard Blue Devils and Lady Bleu Devils men's and women's cross country teams represents Dillard University in New Orleans, Louisiana, United States. The school's teams currently competes in the Gulf Coast Athletic Conference, which is part of the National Association of Intercollegiate Athletics.

Men's track and field
The Dillard Blue Devils track and field team represents Dillard University in New Orleans, Louisiana, United States. The school's team currently competes in outdoor track and field in the Gulf Coast Athletic Conference, which is part of the National Association of Intercollegiate Athletics.

Women's track and field
The Dillard Lady Blue Devils track and field team represents Dillard University in New Orleans, Louisiana, United States. The school's team currently competes in outdoor track and field in the Gulf Coast Athletic Conference, which is part of the National Association of Intercollegiate Athletics.

Women's volleyball
The Dillard Lady Bleu Devils women's volleyball team represents Dillard University in New Orleans, Louisiana, United States. The school's team currently competes in the Gulf Coast Athletic Conference, which is part of the National Association of Intercollegiate Athletics. The team plays its home games at 1,500-seat Dent Hall.

Former varsity sports

Football
Dillard University formerly sponsored a varsity football team starting in 1935. The team was suspended for the 1965 season and then disbanded. The team played at Dillard Stadium.

Athletic facilities

Current facilities
Dent HallDent Hall is the university's gymnasium and was named in honor of Dr. Albert W. Dent, the university's third president. It was built in 1969 and is the home of the Bleu Devils and the Lady Bleu Devils basketball teams and volleyball team. A weight center and an Olympic-size swimming pool are also located in the building.

Former facilities
Dillard StadiumDillard Stadium is a former stadium on the campus of Dillard University. It was the former home of the Dillard football team. The stadium was located off of Gentilly Road in New Orleans.
Henson HallHenson Hall is the university's old gymnasium and is named in honor of the explorer and co-discoverer of the North Pole, Matthew Alexander Henson. It was built in 1950.

References

External links
Official website